Everyone I Have Ever Slept With 1963–1995 (1995), also known as The Tent, was an artwork by Tracey Emin. The work was a tent with the appliquéd names of, literally, everyone she had ever slept with (not necessarily had sex with). It achieved iconic status and was owned by Charles Saatchi. Since its destruction in the 2004 Momart London warehouse fire, Emin has refused to recreate the piece.

History
Emin calls Everyone I Have Ever Slept With 1963–1995 "my tent" or "the tent" and considers it one of her two "seminal pieces", the other being My Bed; she has described both as "seminal, fantastic and amazing work".

Everyone I Have Ever Slept With 1963–1995 was a tent appliquéd with the 102 names of the people with whom she had slept as of 1995. The title is often misinterpreted as a euphemism for sexual partners, but was in fact intended more inclusively:

The names include family, friends, drinking partners, lovers and even two numbered foetuses. The name of Emin's ex-boyfriend Billy Childish could be seen prominently through the tent opening, as could the particularly curious name of Roberto Navikas. The tent was square and blue; its shape was reminiscent of the Shell Grotto, Margate, with which Emin was very familiar from childhood; on the tent's floor was the text, "With myself, always myself, never forgetting".

The work was created during a relationship she had in the mid-1990s with Carl Freedman, who had been an early friend of, and collaborator with, Damien Hirst, and who had co-curated seminal Britart shows, such as Modern Medicine and Gambler. In 1995, Freedman curated the show Minky Manky at the South London Gallery, where the tent was first shown. At that time Emin had not achieved the level of fame she later did, and was mainly known in art circles; she was fortunate to be able to exhibit alongside better-known artists such as Hirst, Gilbert and George and Sarah Lucas. Emin described the genesis of the work, which turned out unexpectedly to be the show's highlight:

At that time Emin refused to sell work directly to Charles Saatchi because she disapproved of his advertising work for Margaret Thatcher, whom she accused of "crimes against humanity". Instead Saatchi bought it on the secondary market from a private dealer, Eric Franck, at a premium price of £40,000. Emin had originally sold it for £12,000. She reconciled with Saatchi in 1999. Art world gossip in 2001 was that Saatchi had been offered £300,000 for it; Emin's comment on this was, "He won't resell, but the art is his. He can do what he likes with it."

Saatchi exhibited the tent in the 1997 Sensation exhibition at the Royal Academy in London, and at the later staging of the exhibition at the Brooklyn Museum of Art in New York, on Chris Ofili's The Holy Virgin Mary.

Momart fire
In 2004, the tent was destroyed in a fire at the East London Momart warehouse, along with two of Emin's other works and 100 more from Saatchi's collection, including works by Hirst, Jake and Dinos Chapman and Martin Maloney. Many other works were also lost, including major pieces by Patrick Heron and William Redgrave. The public and media reaction was not sympathy but mockery and scorn, focusing on the Young British Artists, Hirst, the Chapman Brothers, and Emin, particularly her tent. Tabloid papers The Sun and the Daily Mail both stated they had already created their own replacement tents, and the latter's Godfrey Barker asked, "Didn't millions cheer as this 'rubbish' went up in flames?" The same implication gained applause on BBC Radio 4's Any Questions?; Hugo Rifkind in The Times thought similarly to The Independents Tom Lubbock, who wrote:
It's odd to hear talk about irreplaceable losses. Really? You'd have thought that, with the will and the funding, many of these works were perfectly replaceable. It wouldn't be very hard for Tracey Emin to re-stitch the names of Every One I Have Ever Slept With on to a little tent (it might need some updating since 1995).

Emin took a phlegmatic view of her work's destruction, saying, "The news comes between Iraqi weddings being bombed and people dying in the Dominican Republic in flash floods, so we have to get it into perspective." But she was upset at the public reaction to the fire, pointing both to lack of cultural understanding—"The majority of the British public have no regard or no respect to what me and my peers do, to the point that they laugh at a disaster like a fire"—and to lack of compassion: "It is just not fair and it's not funny and it's not polite and it's bad manners. I would never laugh at a disaster like that—I just have some empathy and sympathy with people's loss."

She also said she could not remake the tent, because "I had the inclination and inspiration 10 years ago to make that, I don't have that inspiration and inclination now ... My work is very personal, which people know, so I can't create that emotion again—it's impossible." At her 2008 Edinburgh retrospective show, she said that after the fire, the Saatchi Gallery had offered her £1 million (the amount of the insurance payment) to remake the tent, but that, although she had recreated some small pieces for the retrospective, to have remade the tent "would just be silly".

In May 2009, Dinos Chapman said that he and his brother Jake recreated the tent. Emin and the Chapmans are represented by White Cube gallery in London. In The Independent, Jerome Taylor questioned whether this was a publicity stunt.

Burn Baby Burn
In collaboration with Uri Geller, artist Stuart Semple collected remains from the Momart fire site and packaged them in eight plastic boxes under the title Burn Baby Burn; the boxes had slogans in pink lettering, including "RIP YBA" which referred to the Young British Artists, amongst whom Emin is classified. Semple stated that fragments of Emin's tent were among the debris collected. The assemblage was offered to, but rejected by, the Tate gallery.

See also
My Bed

Footnotes

References 

Barker, Barry (2003). "Tracey Emin with Barry Barker", University of Brighton, 3 December 2003. Retrieved 19 June 2007.
Barnes, Anthony (2006). "Saatchi's new sensation: the Peeing Madonna", The Independent'''', 17 September 2006. Retrieved 19 June 2007.
Brown, Neil (2006). Tracey Emin. UK: Tate Publishing. .
Didcock, Barry (2006). "The E spot", The Sunday Herald, 30 April 2006. Retrieved from findarticles.com, 19 June 2007.
Edwardes, Charlotte (2004). "New art rises from wreckage of warehouse", The Daily Telegraph, 18 July 2004. Retrieved 19 June 2007.
Gleadell, Colin (2003). "The Old Faithfuls", The Daily Telegraph, 28 March 2003. Retrieved 19 June 2007.
SHOWstudio.com. "In camera – Tracey Emin". Retrieved 19 June 2007.
 Taylor, Jerome. (26 May 2009). 'Chapmans rebuild Emin's tent', The Independent. Retrieved 23 January 2010.The Guardian  "26.05.2004: Art fire". Retrieved 19 June 2007.
Wade, Mike, "Tracey Emin tells Edinburgh she rejected £1m offer to recreate tent", The Times'', 2 August 2008. Retrieved 3 August 2008.

1995 sculptures
Destroyed sculptures
English contemporary works of art
Young British Artists
1995 in England